is a city in Kagoshima Prefecture, Japan. As of May 1, 2010, the city had a population of 51,819 and a population density of 205 persons per km².

The modern city of Hioki was established on May 1, 2005, from the merger of the towns of Fukiage, Higashiichiki, Hiyoshi and Ijūin (all from Hioki District).

Geography

Climate
Hioki has a humid subtropical climate (Köppen climate classification Cfa) with hot summers and mild winters. Precipitation is significant throughout the year, and is heavier in summer, especially the months of June and July.

Adjacent municipalities 
 Kagoshima
 Satsumasendai
 Ichikikushikino
 Minamisatsuma

Demographics
Per Japanese census data, the population of Hioki in 2020 is 47,153 people. Hioki began its first census in 1960, and the brief exodus ended in the 1970s, after which the population remained relatively stable until 2020.

Educational institutions

High schools

Public schools
 Kagoshima prefectural Ijūin High School
 Kagoshima prefectural Fukiage High School

Private schools
 Kagoshima Josei High School
 Kagoshima Ikuei-kan High School

Transport

Railways 
 Kagoshima Main Line
 Yunomoto Station - Higashi-Ichiki Station - Ijūin Station

Roads 
 Expressway
 Minami-Kyushu Expressway
 Miyama Interchange - Miyama Parking area - Ijuin Interchange
 National Highways
 National Route 3
 National Route 270

Sister cities 
  Teshikaga, Hokkaido
  Ōgaki, Gifu
  Sekigahara, Gifu
  Aira, Kagoshima
  Subang Jaya, Selangor, Malaysia
  Namwon, Jeollabuk-do, South Korea

Visitor attractions 
 Tokushige Shrine
 Yunomoto Hot spring
 Fukiage Beach
 Miyama (Satsuma ware, former name: Naeshirogawa)
Izaku Castle, Home Castle of Shimazu clan
Ichiuji Castle and Statue of Shimazu Yoshihiro

Festivals 
 Myoenji Mairi
 Ijuin Ume Marathon

Notable people from Hioki 

 Masafumi Arima (admiral in the Imperial Japanese Navy)
 Satoshi Irifune (marathon runner)
 Izumi Inamori (actress)
 Keisuke Iwashita (football player)
 Tsuyoshi Nagabuchi (singer)
 Mika Nakashima (singer)
 Naokuni Nomura (admiral in the Imperial Japanese Navy)
 Shigenori Tōgō (Ministry of Foreign Affairs)

References

External links

 Hioki City official website 
 Kagoshima Prefectural Visitors Bureau official website 

Cities in Kagoshima Prefecture